Redl is a surname. Notable people with the surname include:

Alfred Redl (1864–1913), Austrian officer and spy
Barbara Redl (born 1968), Austrian actress
Christian Redl (born 1948), German actor
Doug Redl (born 1956), Canadian football player
Erwin Redl (born 1963), Austrian artist
Gerhard Redl (born 1962), Austrian bobsledder
Mark Redl (born 1993), German footballer
Michael Redl (born 1936), German handball player
Scott Redl (born 1961), Canadian football player
Vlasta Redl, Czech folk musician